Atlas Assurance Company was a British life and fire insurance company established at the beginning of the 19th century in England. Its headquarters were in London, and it had several branches around the world, including Buenos Aires, Manila, Berlin and Washington, D.C. 

It was established in 1808 in the city of London, and later expanded its branches around the world. This company worked until 1959, the year it was acquired by the Assurance Corporation.

References 

Insurance companies of the United Kingdom
Financial services companies based in the City of London
1808 establishments in England
British companies disestablished in 1959
1959 disestablishments in England
British companies established in 1808